WISE J2030+0749 is a nearby brown dwarf of spectral type T1.5, in constellat,ion Delphinus, approximately 10.5 pc (34.2 ly) from Earth.

History of observations
Discovery of WISE J2030+0749 was announced in 2013 by Mace et al. and independently by Bihain et al.

Mace et al. selected T-type brown dwarf candidates from WISE All-Sky source catalogue and carried out follow up observations using a variety of telescopes. September 11, 2011 WISE J2030+0749 was observed using SpeX at Infrared Telescope Facility (IRTF). The discovery paper was submitted to The Astrophysical Journal Supplement, accepted for publication on 2013 January 15 and published in March, 2013. The total number of announced in Mace et al. (2013) brown dwarfs is 87, all are of T-type.

Bihain et al. selected sources with colours typical for T dwarfs from WISE All-Sky source catalogue and checked them for high proper motion using older surveys: 2MASS, DENIS, SDSS, SSS, DSS and UKIDSS. Three objects  among about ten candidates, including WISE J2030+0749, were selected for spectroscopic follow up with Large Binocular Telescope (LBT). November 8, 2012 Bihain et al. carried out follow up observations of WISE J2030+0749 with near-Infrared spectrograph LUCI 1 on LBT. June 25, 2013 Astronomy & Astrophysics received the discovery paper, which was accepted for publication 10 July 2013.

Distance
Distance of WISE J2030+0749 was estimated by Bihain et al. using mean absolute magnitudes of single T1/T2 dwarfs, derived by Dupuy & Liu (2012) from trigonometric parallaxes: 10.5 ± 2.6 pc (34.2 ± 8.5 ly).

WISE J2030+0749 distance estimates

Non-trigonometric estimates are marked in italic. The best estimate is marked in bold.

See also
Two other T dwarfs, announced in Bihain et al (2013):
 WISE J0457−0207 (T2)
 WISE J0521+1025 (T7.5)

References

Delphinus (constellation)
Brown dwarfs
T-type stars
WISE objects
20130116